A gantry is an overhead bridge-like structure supporting equipment such as a crane, signals, or cameras.

Devices and structures
Gantry (medical), cylindrical scanner assembly used for medical 3D-imaging or treatment
Gantry (transport), an overhead assembly on which highway signs or railway signals are posted
Gantry (rocketry), the frame which encloses and services a rocket at its launch pad
Gantry crane, a crane having a hoist fitted in a trolley for parallel movement
Rubber tyred gantry crane, a mobile gantry crane used in intermodal operations
Gantry tower or anchor portal, a structure commonly found in electrical substation or transmission line
Scaffolding, occasionally referred to as a gantry when used as a support framework

Places
Gantry Plaza State Park, in New York City

Arts, entertainment, and media
Elmer Gantry, a 1927 novel by Sinclair Lewis
Elmer Gantry (film), a 1960 film based on the novel
Gantry (musical), a 1970 musical by Peter Bellwood, Fred Tobias, and Stanley Lebowsky, based on the novel

See also
 Gentry (disambiguation)